Hilarographa tetralina is a species of moth of the family Tortricidae. It is found on the Solomon Islands.

References

Moths described in 1930
Hilarographini